is a Japanese development bank incorporated on 1 October 2008 under the Development Bank of Japan Inc. Law (Law No. 85 of 2007). Current ownership structure of DBJ is solely owned by the Government of Japan through the Minister of Finance.

Overview 
The Bank provides integrated investment and loan services to domestic and international clients. A large number of the clients are Japanese companies requiring basic investments. DBJ provides most of them at low and flexible interest rates, and so the default rate is very low.

History 
 1947 January: Establishment of Rehabilitation Finance Corporation
 1951 April: Development Bank of Law established. Consequently, Development Bank of Japan was formed
 1956 June: Hokkaidō-Tōhoku Development Finance Public Corporation was formed under establishment of Hokkaidō-Tōhoku Development Finance Public Corporation Law (HTDFC Law)
 1957 June: After amendment of HTDFC Law, Hokkaidō-Tōhoku Development Finance Public Corporation was merged into Development Bank of Japan
 1999 June: Amended Development Bank of Japan Law established
 1999 October: Transfer of approval of all rights and responsibilities of Japan Development Bank and Hokkaido-Tohoku Development　Finance Public Corporation to the Development Bank of Japan
 2008 October: Dissolution of the existing Development Bank of Japan and establishment of a new corporation, the Development Bank of Japan Inc.
2017: Partnership announced with M&A advisory firm BDA Partners.

Financial information (at the end of 2008)
Total Assets: 14.0174 trillion yen (or US$153.88 billion)
Lending Balance: 12.0266 trillion yen (or US$132.03 billion)
Capital Ratio (BIS): 18.69%
[Exchange Rate: US$1 vs 91.09 yen (on 18 September 2008)]

References

External links
 Excerpt from the New DBJ Law (Law No. 85 of 2007)
 Company Website

Banks of Japan
Banks established in 2008
Government-owned companies of Japan
National development banks